Andronikos Angelos Komnenos Doukas Palaiologos (ca. 1282–1328), was a Byzantine aristocrat and military leader.

He was born ca. 1282 to Demetrios Doukas Komnenos Koutroules, son of the ruler of Epirus, Michael II Komnenos Doukas, and Anna Komnene Palaiologina, the daughter of the Byzantine emperor Michael VIII Palaiologos. By 1326 he held the post of protovestiarios and the rank of protosebastos. In 1327–28, Andronikos was military governor of Velegrada (modern Berat). During the Byzantine civil war of 1321–28, he initially sided with Andronikos III Palaiologos against his grandfather Andronikos II Palaiologos, but then switched sides. As a result, when Andronikos III Palaiologos ousted his grandfather in 1328, he arrested his family and confiscated his property and his extensive estates in Macedonia. Andronikos was thereby forced to defect to Serbia, dying in exile at Prilep in 1328.

He was married to an unnamed daughter of a certain Kokalas. The couple had at least two daughters, the future queen-consort of Epirus Anna Palaiologina and another, unnamed daughter, who married John Angelos.

References

Sources

1280s births
1328 deaths
Year of birth uncertain
14th-century Byzantine people
Byzantine defectors
Byzantine governors
History of Berat
Andronikos
People of the Kingdom of Serbia (medieval)
Protovestiarioi
Protosebastoi